Forefront is the barbershop quartet that won the International Quartet Championship for 2016 at the Barbershop Harmony Society's annual international convention, in Nashville, Tennessee. The quartet had placed second in the 2014 and 2015 international contests, after competing at the international level annually since 2010.  Forefront formed in August 2009.

Discography
Forefront (CD; June 2013)
The Loveliest Thing (CD; June 2016)

References

External links
 Official website
 AIC entry

Barbershop Harmony Society
Barbershop quartets